Hypericum annulatum subsp. annulatum is a subspecies of Hypericum annulatum, which is a species of the genus Hypericum.

Description
The subspecies has a single stem with many black glands. The leaves also have numerous black glands. Its sepals have cilia that are twice as long as its glands. Its petals are red tinged and also have black glands.

Distribution
The subspecies can be found in Bosnia & Herzegovina, Macedonia, Sardinia, Albania, Bulgaria, Greece, and Switzerland.

References

annulatum subsp. annulatum
Plant subspecies